Lubia may refer to:

 Łubia, a village in Poland
 Lubia or Lubya, a former Palestinian village